Xulon Press (pronounced "zoo-lon") is a hybrid publisher owned by the Christian publishing company Salem Media Group. In 2007 it claimed to be "the largest publisher of Christian books in North America", claiming more than 3,900 print-on-demand titles published by 2007. As of 2022, the website claimed Xulon Press published over 15,000 unique book titles and that more than a million copies of its books had been printed and sold. Its titles are mainly in the categories of Christian living, theology, church growth, discipleship, Bible studies, fiction, poetry, biographies, and others.  For a fixed fee the press will publish an author's finished manuscript in paperback, hard cover, and electronic form.  Once published, customers may order the book directly from online retailers, and retailers may order the book through distributors.

According to their company contact page, the Xulon Press office is located in Maitland, Florida, USA.

History
Founded in 2000 by Christian author and publisher Tom Freiling. The company was originally incorporated in Virginia in May of 2001 and then moved to Florida in May of 2002. The principal "place of business" was still listed as Fairfax, Virginia until 2005, when the physical address was moved to Longwood, Florida. Xulon Press was bought in 2006 and is now a part of Salem Media Group. In 2016, Salem Media bought a Minneapolis, Minnesota, USA based self-publishing company Hillcrest Media and merged it with Xulon Press.

References

External links
www.xulonpress.com – Xulon Press Website
www.xulonpressblog.com – Xulon Press Blog

Publishing companies established in 2000
Self-publishing companies
Salem Media Group properties
2000 establishments in the United States